Asano Nagayoshi (1927–2007) was the 30th family head of the Asano clan, which ruled over Hiroshima Domain before 1871.

Early life 
Asano's parents were Asano Nagatake and Princess Yamashina no miya Yasuko, daughter of Prince Yamashina Kikumaro.

References 

1927 births
2007 deaths
Asano clan